Starfall is a 1981 Soviet romance film directed by Igor Talankin.

Plot 
The film tells about a man and a woman who met in a front-line city and fell in love. They wanted to get married, but the war and the mother of the main character interfered with them.

Cast 
 Alla Demidova
 Pyotr Fyodorov as Misha Yerofeyev
 Darya Mikhaylova as Lida
 Maksim Prizov as Mishka
 Nadezhda Bochkova
 Pyotr Yurchenkov
 Vera Glagoleva
 Olga Anokhina
 Aleksandr Bespaly
 Sergei Desnitsky

References

External links 
 

1981 films
1980s Russian-language films
Soviet romance films
1980s romance films